Thoicha is a 2010 Indian Meitei language dark fantasy film produced and directed by Ningthoujam Prem. The  film features Leishangthem Tonthoingambi Devi as the titular protagonist and Hamom Sadananda in the lead roles. Its second and third installments Thoicha 2 and Thoicha 3 were released in 2013 and 2017 respectively.

Cast
 Leishangthem Tonthoingambi Devi as Thoicha
 Hamom Sadananda as Ibohal
 Longjam Ongbi Lalitabi as Thoicha's mother
 Reena as Thoicha's friend
 Wangkhem Lalitkumar
 Nganthoi

References

2010s Meitei-language films
Meitei folklore in popular culture
Meitei mythology in popular culture
Indian dark fantasy films
Indian supernatural horror films
Films about magic and magicians
Films about magic
Indian ghost films
2010 films